Assane Thiam (born 22 November 1948) is a Senegalese basketball player. He competed in the men's tournament at the 1972 Summer Olympics.

References

1948 births
Living people
Senegalese men's basketball players
Olympic basketball players of Senegal
Basketball players at the 1972 Summer Olympics
Place of birth missing (living people)